Ben Henderson (born November 13, 1957) is a member of the Edmonton City Council, currently representing Ward 8.

He was a candidate in the 2001 municipal election and 2004 municipal election and gained his seat on City Council in the 2007 municipal election, following Michael Phair's retirement.

He is married to former Edmonton-Centre Liberal MLA, Laurie Blakeman.

Henderson was the Liberal Candidate for Edmonton Mill Woods in the 2021 Canadian Federal Election. He came second to incumbent Tim Uppal.

Electoral History

References

External links
Ben Henderson profile, City of Edmonton website
Ben Henderson's website

1957 births
Living people
American emigrants to Canada
Edmonton city councillors
Politicians from New York City